Julius Bassianus (born in the second half of the 2nd century, died 217) was an Arab high priest of Elagabalus at the Temple of the Sun in Emesa, Syria, where this solar deity was worshipped in a shape of a black stone. The name Elagabalus derives from Ilāh (a Semitic word for "god") and gabal (an Arabic word for "mountain"), resulting in "the God of the Mountain," the Emesene manifestation of the deity. Bassianus was a member of the Royal family of Emesa (modern Homs), which was a part of the Arab aristocracy in this client kingdom of the Roman Empire. The beginning of his priesthood is unknown, but by 187 he was a high priest at Emesa. Bassianus was a son of a Julius and his paternal uncle was Julius Agrippa, who served as a Primipilaris (a former leading Centurion).

Future emperor Lucius Septimius Severus had visited Emesa, based on a promising horoscope that he would find his future wife in Syria. Bassianus introduced Severus to his two daughters. Bassianus' wife is unknown. His elder daughter Julia Maesa was married to a Syrian noble Gaius Julius Avitus Alexianus and they had two daughters: Julia Soaemias Bassiana and Julia Avita Mamaea. His younger daughter Julia Domna was not married. Severus and Domna married not so long after. Domna bore Severus two sons, Lucius Septimius Bassianus (Caracalla, 4 April 188-8 April 217) and Publius Septimius Geta (7 March 189-19 December 211). Caracalla and Geta would become future Roman Emperors and heirs to their father. After Caracalla's death, Julia Maesa's grandson became emperor, Elagabalus, whom she prevailed to adopt another grandson, the son of Julia Avita Mamaea, who took the name Alexander Severus and eventually became emperor himself. Julius Bassianus is a possible descendant of Gaius Julius Alexion.

Severan dynasty family tree

See also

Emesan Dynasty
 Julia Domna
 Elagabalus (deity)

References

Sources

External links
 Cleopatra Selene of Mauretania, Internet Archive
 https://www.livius.org/jo-jz/julia/julia_maesa.html
 http://www.roman-emperors.org/sevjulia.htm
 https://www.livius.org/ei-er/emperors/emperors03.html
 http://www.roman-emperors.org/sepsev.htm

2nd-century Romans
3rd-century Romans
2nd-century Arabs
3rd-century Arabs
Severan dynasty
People of Roman Syria
3rd-century deaths
Emesene dynasty
Bassianus, Gaius
Year of birth unknown
3rd-century clergy